Tim Petros (September 12, 1961 – March 30, 2020) was a Canadian football player who played for the Calgary Stampeders from 1984 to 1990. He previously played football at the University of Calgary. Petros died after a heart attack in 2020.

References

1961 births
2020 deaths
Calgary Stampeders players
Players of Canadian football from Alberta
Canadian football people from Calgary